Air Patrol is a 1962 American CinemaScope drama film directed by Maury Dexter and written by Harry Spalding. The film stars Willard Parker, Merry Anders, Robert Dix, John Holland, Russ Bender and Douglass Dumbrille.

The film was released on July 17, 1962, by 20th Century Fox.

Plot
A Los Angeles detective Sgt. Castle and his two partners investigate the robbery of a valuable Fragonard painting by a thief who pilots a helicopter.

Cast 
 Willard Parker as Lt. Vern Taylor
 Merry Anders as Mona Whitney
 Robert Dix as Sgt. Bob Castle
 John Holland as Arthur Murcott
 Russ Bender as Sgt. Lou Kurnitz
 Douglass Dumbrille as Millard Nolan 
 George Eldredge as Howie Franklin
 Ivan Bonar as Oliver Dunning
 Jack Younger as Paper Boy
 Glen Marshall as Security Guard
 Ray Dannis as Security Guard
 Stacey Winters as Mrs. Hortense Jackter
 LaRue Farlow as Nolan's Associate

References

External links 
 
 
 
 

1962 films
1960s English-language films
20th Century Fox films
American drama films
1962 drama films
Films directed by Maury Dexter
Films scored by Albert Glasser
1960s American films